Nitrophenols are compounds of the formula HOC6H5−x(NO2)x.  The conjugate bases are called nitrophenolates.  Nitrophenols are more acidic than phenol itself.

Mono-nitrophenols

with the formula HOC6H4NO2.  Three isomeric nitrophenols exist: 

 o-Nitrophenol (2-nitrophenol; OH and NO2 groups are neighboring; CAS number: 88-75-5), a yellow crystalline solid (m.p. 46 °C).
 m-Nitrophenol (3-nitrophenol, CAS number: 554-84-7), a yellow solid (m.p. 97 °C) and precursor to the drug mesalazine (5-aminosalicylic acid).
 p-Nitrophenol (4-nitrophenol, CAS number: 100-02-7), yellow crystals  (m.p. 114 °C). It is a precursor to the rice herbicide fluorodifen, the pesticide parathion, and the human analgesic paracetamol (also known as acetaminophen).
The mononitrated phenols are often hydrogenated to the corresponding aminophenols that are also useful industrially.

Di- and trinitrophenols

 2,4-Dinitrophenol (m.p. 83 °C) is a moderately strong acid (pKa = 4.89).

 2,4,6-Trinitrophenol is better known as picric acid, which has a well-developed chemistry.

Safety
Nitrophenols are poisonous. Occasionally, nitrophenols contaminate the soil near former explosives or fabric factories and military plants, and current research is aimed at remediation.

References

Nitrobenzenes
Phenols